United Nations Security Council resolution 683, adopted on 22 December 1990, after recalling Resolution 21 (1947) which approved the Trusteeship Territory of the Japanese Mandated Islands (since known as the Trust Territory of the Pacific Islands) as well as Chapter XII of the United Nations Charter which established the United Nations Trusteeship system, the council determined that, in the light of entry into force of new status agreements for Federated States of Micronesia, the Marshall Islands and the Northern Mariana Islands, the objectives of the Trusteeship Agreement had been completed and therefore ended the Trusteeship Agreement with those entities.

The council also hoped that the people of Palau, which had not yet completed the negotiations, will be freely able to exercise their right to self-determination, as the above-mentioned states already had. At the same time, the council welcomed the Administering Authority's assurance that it would assist the Government of Palau in attaining its final status in determining its future direction.

Resolution 683 was adopted by 14 votes in favour, with Cuba voting against the resolution, stating it had felt the council had not properly discharged its responsibilities. The Cuban representative said that it should have given the people of the territories concerned an opportunity to explain their reasons for not wanting the council to take the action it had taken.

See also
 Compact of Free Association
 List of United Nations Security Council Resolutions 601 to 700 (1987–1991)
 United Nations Trust Territories

References

External links
 
Text of the Resolution at undocs.org

 0683
United Nations Trusteeship Council
History of Micronesia
 0683
 0683
 0683
 0683
1990 in the Federated States of Micronesia
1990 in the Marshall Islands
December 1990 events